The Journal of Economic Psychology is a bimonthly peer-reviewed academic journal covering behavioral economics. It was founded by Willem Frederik (Fred) van Raaij in 1981 and is published by Elsevier on behalf of the International Association for Research in Economic Psychology, of which it is the official journal. The editors-in-chief are Carlos Alós-Ferrer (University of Zurich) and Eldad Yechiam (Technion - Israel Institute of Technology). According to the Journal Citation Reports, the journal has a 2020 impact factor of 2.037.

References

External links

Elsevier academic journals
Publications established in 1981
English-language journals
Psychology journals
Behavioral economics
Academic journals associated with international learned and professional societies
Bimonthly journals